The 1989–90 Stanford Cardinal women's basketball team represented Stanford University in the 1989–90 NCAA Division I women's basketball season. The Cardinal were coached by Tara VanDerveer who was in her fifth year. The Cardinal were members of the Pacific-10 Conference. They won their first NCAA Championship.

Roster

Schedule

|-
!colspan=9 style="background:#8C1515; color:white;"| Regular season

|-
!colspan=9 style="background:#8C1515;"| NCAA women's tournament

Rankings

References

Stanford Cardinal women's basketball seasons
NCAA Division I women's basketball tournament championship seasons
NCAA Division I women's basketball tournament Final Four seasons
Stanford